Peter Silvester may refer to:

 Peter Silvester (1734–1808), U.S. Representative from New York
 Peter H. Silvester (1807–1882), his grandson, U.S. Representative from New York
 Peter Silvester (footballer) (born 1948), retired English footballer
 Peter P. Silvester (1935–1996), electrical engineer

See also
Peter Sylvester (1937–2007), German painter and graphic artist